Long Island Academy is an American soccer team based in Hempstead, New York, United States. Founded in 2006, the team plays in the National Premier Soccer League (NPSL), a national amateur league at the fourth tier of the American Soccer Pyramid, in the Northeast Atlantic Division.

The team plays its home games on the Competition Field on the campus of Adelphi University in nearby Garden City, New York, where they have played since 2007. The team's colors are red, navy blue, and white.

The team also has a sister organization, the Long Island Fury, which plays in the WPSL.

Year-by-year

Honors

Domestic
National Premier Soccer League
Northeast - Atlantic Division (NPSL):
 Winners (1): 2008

Head coaches
  Paul Riley (2007–2008)
  Adrian Gaitan (2009)
  Terry Uellendahl (2010–present)

Stadia
 Competition Field at Adelphi University; Garden City, New York (2007–present)
 Mitchel Athletic Complex; Uniondale, New York 2 games (2010)

External links
 Long Island Academy

National Premier Soccer League teams
Sports in Long Island
Men's soccer clubs in New York (state)
2006 establishments in New York (state)
Association football clubs established in 2006